The Intercontinental Stakes is a Grade III American Thoroughbred horse race for fillies and mares aged four years old and older, over a distance of six furlongs on the turf held annually in early June at Belmont Park in Elmont, New York.  The event currently carries a purse of $200,000.

History

The race was inaugurated in 2014 with a stakes purse of $100,000.

The event is held on the Thursday before the Belmont Stakes as part of the Belmont Racing Festival.

In 2017 the event was classified as Grade III.

The race is named after American Champion Female Turf Horse for 2005 Intercontinental who in that year won the Breeders' Cup Filly & Mare Turf.

In 2022 the distance of the event was decreased from seven furlongs to six furlongs.

Records
Speed record: 
6 furlongs: 1:07.59 - Caravel  (2022)
7 furlongs: 1:19.83 - Significant Form (2019)

Largest margin of victory:
  lengths - Zindaya (2015)

Most wins:
 2 – Zindaya (2015, 2016)

Most wins by a jockey:
 2 – Irad Ortiz Jr. (2019, 2020)

Most wins by a trainer:
 3 - Chad C. Brown (2016, 2019, 2020)

Most wins by an owner:
 No owner has won this race more than once.

Winners

See also
 List of American and Canadian Graded races

References

Graded stakes races in the United States
2014 establishments in New York (state)
Recurring sporting events established in 2014
Horse races in New York (state)
Belmont Park
Grade 3 stakes races in the United States
Turf races in the United States